James Norman (February 1883 – death unknown), nicknamed "Big Jim", was an American Negro league third baseman in the 1910s.

A native of Tennessee, Norman made his Negro leagues debut in 1909 with the Kansas City Giants. Norman also played for the French Lick Plutos for three seasons. He then played for the Chicago American Giants in 1914.

References

External links
  and Seamheads

1883 births
Date of birth missing
Place of birth missing
Place of death missing
Year of death missing
Chicago American Giants players
French Lick Plutos players
Baseball infielders
Kansas City Giants players